Gulf Wild is a nonprofit organization operating in the Gulf of Mexico. Gulf Wild works with commercial fishermen to encourage and facilitate fishery conservation and innovation. Gulf Wild has implemented traceability practices, including placing a numbered gill tag on every Gulf Wild fish. This numbered tag tracks who harvested the fish, from where, and at what port the fish landed. Consumers can use the gill tag number to access this information via the Gulf Wild website.

Conservation standards

Gulf Wild fishermen adhere to the following current national and international regulations:
 The Gulf of Mexico Reef Fish Management Plan  and amendments.
 Science-based quotas.
 Gear Restrictions — including turtle excluder devices and area closures to reduce sea turtle interactions. 
 Compliance with Federal Fisheries Observer Program. 
 Individual Fishing Quota (IFQ) requirements — including active IFQ accounts to catch, hold, land, sell and/or transport fish.
 Monitoring/enforcement — including fishing call-in/call-out to federal authorities, 24/7 vessel monitoring and random checks by enforcement officers.

Fishery Improvement Projects (FIP)
Gulf Wild vessels and fishermen also participate in Fishery Improvement Projects (FIP) to address sustainability issues in the Gulf of Mexico fishery. 

FIP Regulations include:
 Prohibition on high grading (intentionally discarded low-value fish for higher-value fish)
 Prohibition on discarding any target fish (except where required by regulations, such as minimum size limits)
 Implementation of the Gulf Wild voluntary electronic video monitoring program (where available) with full on-board video monitoring, assuring compliance with conservation covenants and fishing regulations. 
 Implementation of Bird Excluder Devices designed for minimizing shorebird loss in gear entanglements.
 Adherence to a maximized retention fishery.
 Landing interviews with Gulf Wild staff for QA/QC standards.
 Tagging of every species caught and retained to be entered into the TransparenSea System
 Participation in Shareholders’ Alliance and National Marine Fisheries Service (NMFS) research projects to establish better data collection for reef fish stock assessments.

Additionally, all Gulf Wild fishermen, vessels, owners, and fish houses participate in periodic voluntary audits to verify adherence to Gulf Wild's Conservation Covenants, verification requirements, and food safety testing protocols. As a last step in the process, Gulf Wild's supply chain partners who wish to participate also agree to an annual review and periodic audits to ensure all standards and practices are met.

Programs

Gulf Wild's conservation programs include:

TransparenSea

TransparenSea is a real-time seafood traceability database for gathering, analyzing, and using Gulf Wild seafood catch data. Fishermen in this program have agreed to specific Conservation Covenants. When their fish are landed, comprehensive data transfer employing the TransparenSea system takes place, capturing, compiling, and sharing information about each fish that is caught. This program allows retailers, restaurateurs, and consumers access to this data about the fish they purchase by using the unique identification numbers and QR codes that appear on the gill tags of every fish. This includes:
 Specific fish type
 Where and how the fish was caught in the US Gulf of Mexico waters
 Name and background of captain and fishing vessel
 Fish house and city where seafood was landed
 Chain of Custody information as the fish is traced through the supply chain
 Conservation techniques employed

This data is also used for monitoring fishing activity with a goal of maintaining sustainable fisheries in the Gulf of Mexico.

ByCatch of the Day

The ByCatch of the Day program promotes use of bycatch, lesser-known seafood alternatives to prevent wasteful discarding of non-target species and to enhance overall fishery sustainability. Gulf Wild provides educational opportunities and marketing support that helps consumers understand, and develop a preference for these lesser-known species. Fish are tagged and individually numbered using Gulf Wild's TransparenSea tracking system.

Awards

T.J. Tate of Gulf Wild received the SeaWeb 2015 Seafood Champion Award for Vision for her work with Gulf of Mexico fishermen to implement advanced traceability standards, technology, and techniques.

See also

References

External links
 

Environmental organizations based in Florida
Fish conservation organizations
+
Fishing in the United States
St. Augustine, Florida
Gulf Coast of the United States
Gulf of Mexico